Croanford (meaning ford of a little hut) is a hamlet in Cornwall, England. It is in the parish of Egloshayle.

References

Hamlets in Cornwall